"Promises" is a rock song by Irish rock band the Cranberries. It is the first single from the band's fourth album, Bury the Hatchet, released in 1999. The song was the only single from the album to chart in the US and the last single before their hiatus. The song, which has a heavy rock beat with strident lead guitar, deals with the subject of divorce. A music video involving a cowboy confronting a witch/scarecrow hybrid (played by Maïwenn), directed by Olivier Dahan, was released to promote the single.

"Promises" became the band's ninth and last UK top-forty hit, reaching number 13 on the UK Singles Charts and number 19 in Ireland. Elsewhere, the song peaked atop the Spanish Singles Chart and reached the top 20 in Canada, Iceland, New Zealand, Norway, and Switzerland while also charting in several other European countries.

Track listings
UK CD1
 "Promises" (edit)
 "The Sweetest Thing" – 3:33
 "Linger" (live, August 1996)

UK CD2
 "Promises"
 "Dreams" (live at the Nobel Peace Prize Concert, Oslo)
 "Promises" (live at the Nobel Peace Prize Concert, Oslo)

Canadian maxi-single
 "Promises" (radio edit) – 3:30
 "The Sweetest Thing" – 3:33
 "Promises" – 5:27
 "Linger" (live) – 4:40

Charts

Release history

References

1999 singles
1999 songs
The Cranberries songs
Island Records singles
Mercury Records singles
Music videos directed by Olivier Dahan
Number-one singles in Spain
Songs written by Dolores O'Riordan